2017 Tochigi SC season.

League table

J3 League

References

External links
 J.League official site

Tochigi SC
Tochigi SC seasons